Bartlett is an unincorporated community in southwestern Wesley Township, Washington County, Ohio, United States.  It has a post office with the ZIP code 45713.  It sits at the intersection of State Routes 550 and 555 near Coal Run, a subsidiary of Wolf Creek, which meets the Muskingum River at Waterford to the north.  Near Bartlett is located the Shinn Covered Bridge, which spans Wolf Creek.

History
Bartlett was laid out in 1832. A post office called Bartlett has been in operation since 1834. Amos Bartlett, the first postmaster, gave the community his name.

References

Unincorporated communities in Washington County, Ohio
Unincorporated communities in Ohio